Viktor Worms (born 30 August 1959) is a German radio and television host and producer.

Career
Worms was born in Düsseldorf. After graduating from high school Koblenzer Straße in Düsseldorf in 1981, Worms completed a traineeship at Radio Luxembourg. He then worked as an editor and presenter for the station, presenting the Morningshow along with Hugo Egon Balder and Hans Werner Olm. He gained notoriety from 1985 to 1989 as a host of the popular ZDF-Hitparade, which he took over from Dieter Thomas Heck, who has criticised Worms for his handling of the show and for not caring about the German Schlager genre. From October 1990 to September 1991, Worms presented the TV show Stadt Land Fluß on Tele 5 channel. In addition, he worked since 1988 for Antenne Bayern radio, first as a presenter, and from 1988 to 1994 as head of entertainment and head of vocal marketing. In 1994 he became program director at Antenne Bayern, significantly developing the channel. At the same time he worked as a freelance radio consultant until 1998 (eg in Austria / moderation coach for the BLM, Munich).

From 1 December 1998 to 31 August 2001, Worms was ZDF entertainment chief. In this function he was responsible among others for the production of Wetten, dass..?. In 2002, he was managing director of Dolce Media for ten months, the TV production company of Christoph and Thomas Gottschalk. Since 2003, he has been managing director of MPS Mediconsulting GmbH, which was renamed Worms Mediapartner GmbH in 2004. From 2002 to 2008 he advised the Aktion Mensch. Until 29 March 2008, he produced on behalf of Dolce Media with his company Wetten, dass..?, from 15 July 2008 until the end of 2010 he was editorial director and producer of the ZDF show Willkommen bei Carmen Nebel. Worms was a consultant for Red Bull Media House in 2011. He also collaborated with André Heller on the 2011 show Magnifico.

References

External links
 Official page of Worms Mediapartner

Living people
1959 births
Mass media people from Düsseldorf
ZDF people